Tranomaro is a town and commune in Madagascar. It belongs to the district of Amboasary Sud, which is a part of Anosy Region. The population of the commune was estimated to be approximately 11,000 in 2001 commune census.

Only primary schooling is available. The majority 80% of the population of the commune are farmers, while an additional 15% receives their livelihood from raising livestock. The most important crops are cassava and rice; also maize is an important agricultural product. Industry and services provide employment for 2% and 3% of the population, respectively.

References and notes 

Populated places in Anosy